Aiken High School is a four-year public high school located in Aiken, South Carolina, United States.

History 
Aiken High School was founded in 1888 by the General Assembly of the State of South Carolina, and named Aiken Institute. In 1935, the name was changed to Aiken High School. In 1955, Windsor High School of Windsor, South Carolina consolidated with Aiken High School.

Athletics

State championships 
 Basketball - Girls: 1975
 Football: 1992
 Golf - Boys: 1952, 1953, 1975
 Tennis - Boys: 1996
 Track - Boys: 1950
 Volleyball: 2010, 2016

Notable alumni
William Perry – National Football League (NFL) player
Michael Dean Perry – NFL Player
Jamal Reynolds – NFL player
Leon Lott, commander of the South Carolina State Guard and Sheriff of Richland County, South Carolina

See also
List of high schools in South Carolina

References

External links
Aiken HS homepage

Public high schools in South Carolina
Schools in Aiken County, South Carolina
Educational institutions established in 1888
1888 establishments in South Carolina
Buildings and structures in Aiken, South Carolina